Lithocarpus echinifer is a tree in the beech family Fagaceae. The specific epithet  is from the Latin meaning "having straight spines", referring to the cupule.

Description
The greyish brown bark is fissured or smooth.

Distribution and habitat
Lithocarpus echinifer is endemic to Borneo. Its habitat is dipterocarp forests up to  altitude.

References

echinifer
Endemic flora of Borneo
Trees of Borneo
Plants described in 1929
Flora of the Borneo lowland rain forests